Eirmotus octozona is a species of cyprinid fish in the genus Eirmotus. It inhabits Thailand and western Borneo, and has a maximum length of 3.6 cm (1.4 inches).

References

Cyprinidae
Cyprinid fish of Asia
Fish of Thailand